Girl in the Case may refer to:

Girl in the Case (1934 film), American comedy
Girl in the Case (1944 film), American mystery-comedy